Tamika LaShun Louis (born June 17, 1975) is an American basketball coach who was most recently head women's basketball coach at Delaware State.

Early life and education
Louis was born in Flint, Michigan and was the second of five children to Robert and Joyce Louis. She attended and graduated from Flint Northern High School, where she lettered in basketball and track.

As a freshman at West Virginia University, Louis played 19 games and averaged 3.9 points and 1.5 assists in the 1993–94 season. She then transferred to Fresno State, where she played from 1995 to 1998 and became a captain and starting point guard. As a senior in 1997–98, Louis averaged 5.4 assists per game to rank fourth in the Western Athletic Conference in that statistic.

Louis also was a member of the Fresno State Student-Athlete Advisory Board and had an internship with U.S. Senator Dianne Feinstein of California. Louis completed her bachelor's degree in communications in 1997 at Fresno State, enrolled in the master's in communication program by the start of her senior basketball season, and completed her master's degree in 1999.

Coaching career
Louis started her coaching career as an assistant coach at Central High School  in Fresno, California in the 1998–99 season. She moved to Cleveland and was associate head coach at Cuyahoga Community College in 2000–01 and James Ford Rhodes High School in 2001–02.

Mott CC
From 2002 to 2005, Louis was the head women's basketball coach at Mott Community College in Flint, Michigan, where she led her squad to a 59–35 overall record during her tenure, including a 28–9 record in 2004–05 that included a 16–0 MCCAA Eastern Conference record, NJCAA Region 12 title, and NJCAA Tournament berth. Louis earned Michigan Community College Athletic Association and NJCAA Region XII Coach of the Year honors.

Division I assistant (2007–2012)
From 2007 to 2009, Louis served as an assistant coach and recruiting coordinator for the University of Illinois. During her time at U of I, she recruited two top-20 ranked recruits Destiny Williams and Karisma Penn.

From 2009 to 2011, Louis was an assistant coach and recruiting coordinator for St. John's. Among her players was Second Team All-Big East and Freshman All-American Shennieka Smith.

In the 2011–12 season, Louis served as an assistant coach and recruiting coordinator during the 2011-2012 season at George Washington.

Delaware State
On May 31, 2012, Delaware State University hired Louis as women's basketball head coach. In three seasons, Louis had a 23–67 record. In her final season in 2014–15, multiple players' parents accused Louis of abusive behavior. One letter to the university president alleged that Louis used "harassment, intimidation, and threats to keep the players quiet about her dehumanizing behavior"; that letter led to the university formally investigating Louis and temporarily reassigning her within the athletic department in September 2014. Delaware State reinstated Louis on October 15, 2014; Louis's attorney said the investigation found no wrongdoing on Louis's part. On March 21, 2015, Delaware State decided not to renew Louis's contract. Delaware State finished the 2014–15 season with a 5–25 record.

Business career
In addition to coaching, Louis has also worked at General Motors from 1999 to 2007, including as a Service Development Manager for the Northeast Region. In 2003, she won the company's Corporate Woman of the Year Achievement Award for representing the Accessory Department.

In 2015, Louis became communications manager at Fiat Chrysler Automobiles.

Head coaching record

Junior college

College

References

1975 births
Living people
American women's basketball coaches
Delaware State Hornets women's basketball coaches
Fresno State Bulldogs women's basketball players
George Washington Colonials women's basketball coaches
Junior college women's basketball coaches in the United States
Illinois Fighting Illini women's basketball coaches
Sportspeople from Flint, Michigan
St. John's Red Storm women's basketball coaches
West Virginia Mountaineers women's basketball players
High school basketball coaches in the United States
Basketball players from Flint, Michigan